This is a list of the heads of state of Guyana, from the independence of Guyana in 1966 to the present day.

From 1966 to 1970 the head of state under the Constitution of 1966 was the queen of Guyana, Elizabeth II, who was also the queen of the United Kingdom and the other Commonwealth realms. The monarch was represented in Guyana by a governor-general. Guyana became a republic within the Commonwealth under the Constitution of 1970 and the monarch and governor-general were replaced by a ceremonial president, by that time.

Monarch (1966–1970)
The succession to the throne was the same as the succession to the British throne.

Governor-general
The governor-general was the representative of the monarch in Guyana and exercised most of the powers of the monarch. The governor-general was appointed for an indefinite term, serving at the pleasure of the monarch. Since Guyana was granted independence by the Guyana Independence Act 1966, rather than being first established as a semi-autonomous dominion and later promoted to independence as defined by the Statute of Westminster 1931, the governor-general was to be always appointed solely on the advice of the Cabinet of Guyana without the involvement of the British government, with the sole exception of Richard Luyt, the former colonial governor, who served as governor-general temporarily until he was replaced by David Rose. In the event of a vacancy the Chancellor (the head of the judicial branch, serving directly above the Chief Justice of Guyana) would have served as the officer administering the government.

Following is a list of people who have served as Governor-General of Guyana.

Symbols
 Died in office.

President of Guyana
Under the Constitution of 1970, the first constitution of the Republic of Guyana, the president replaced the monarch as ceremonial head of state. The president was elected by the National Assembly for a six-year term. In the event of a vacancy the Chancellor (the head of the judicial branch, serving directly above the Chief Justice of Guyana) served as acting president. In 1980, the powers of the president were increased, with the establishment of the executive presidency.

Currently, the president is both head of state and head of government and, pursuant to article 91 of the Constitution, is directly elected on the basis of the votes cast in the general election. On Nomination Day, each list of contesting parties designate a member of their list as that party's presidential candidate. The presidential candidate whose party's list of candidates receives the most votes is elected president. In the event of a vacancy, the prime minister becomes president.

Status

Timeline

Standards

Notes

External links
 World Statesmen – Guyana
 Rulers.org – Guyana

Government of Guyana
Heads

Guyana